The 1944 Iowa gubernatorial election was held on November 7, 1944. Republican nominee Robert D. Blue defeated Democratic nominee Richard F. Mitchell with 56.01% of the vote.

Primary elections
Primary elections were held on June 5, 1944.

Democratic primary

Candidates 
Richard F. Mitchell, former Associate Justice of the Iowa Supreme Court

Results

Republican primary

Candidates
Robert D. Blue, incumbent Lieutenant Governor
Henry W. Burma, Speaker of the Iowa House of Representatives
Milton W. Strickler, former State Representative

Results

General election

Candidates
Major party candidates
Robert D. Blue, Republican
Richard F. Mitchell, Democratic 

Other candidates
Glen Williamson, Prohibition
Hugo Bockewitz, Socialist

Results

References

1944
Iowa
Gubernatorial